Montgomery County is a county located in the central portion of the U.S. state of Georgia. As of the 2020 census, the population was 8,610. The county seat is Mount Vernon.

Montgomery County is part of the Vidalia, GA Micropolitan Statistical Area.

History
Montgomery County is named in honor of Richard Montgomery, an American Revolutionary War general killed in 1775 while attempting to capture Quebec City, Canada. It was created on December 19, 1793, from a southern portion of Washington County, Georgia.

Arthur Lott's Plantation was designated the first county seat in 1797.

In 1801, Tattnall County, Georgia was formed from the southern part of Montgomery County. The dividing line between Tatnall and Montgomery ran from the mouth of Limestone Creek on the Oconee River, just below modern Mount Vernon, Georgia, to the mouth of Wolf Creek on the Canoochee River below Metter, Georgia.

The Great Revision
On December 11, 1811, the county lines between Washington County, Montgomery County, and Laurens County were adjusted by the Georgia General Assembly. The northern section of Montgomery between the Oconee River and the Ohoopee River was transferred to Laurens. On December 10, 1812, the county line of Montgomery was significantly adjusted as part of the creation of Emanuel County. Its new boundaries became from the then Laurens and Telfair county line on the Oconee River to the north prong of the Little Ocmulgee River (near present Chauncey, Dodge County, Georgia) down the Little Ocmulgee River as it meanders to its confluence with the Ocmulgee River then downstream as it meanders to the Oconee River, then North 30 degrees to Milligan's Creek in Tatnall County, and then with it to the Montgomery County line. Pendleton Creek (in modern Treutlen and Toombs counties) was used as the border between Montgomery and Emanuel. Because of these transitions Montgomery regained part of the land it had lost in the creation of Tatnall County in 1801 (land along the lower Oconee River), but also lost land along the upper Oconee River to Laurens County.

The creation of Emanuel County put the old county seat within Emanuel's border. On December 12, the Georgia General Assembly appointed the justices of the inferior court of Montgomery county to a commission to designate a new county seat and called for county business to be held until then at the home of James Alston. In 1813, the General Assembly recognized Mount Vernon as the new county seat.

The county line between Telfair County and Montgomery was adjusted once again in 1820 by the Georgia Genera Assembly. The new line differed in the upstream portion of the Little Ocmulgee River and better defined the  line and gave Montgomery a small border with Pulaski County, Georgia and Telfair County some land on the northeast side of the Little Ocmulgee River. The line was to go upstream to its fork then to Browning's mill, a straight line to the mouth of Joiner's Creek (Near modern McRae, Georgia) at the second fork of the Little Ocmulgee River, and then up the second prong to Pulaski County Line.

The land gained by Telfair County from Montgomery County on the northeast side of the Little Ocmulgee River was reversed by the Georgia General Assembly on December 18, 1833.

American Civil War
At the time of the 1850 United States Census, Montgomery had 1,541 whites, 613 slaves. By the 1860 census, there were 2,014 whites, 977 slaves, and 6 Free people of color. The pine barrens and soil quality outside of the river lands made the area unsuitable for slave-heavy cotton producing plantation culture. Montgomery's status as a majority white county led the region developing different attitudes about secession from other areas of Georgia.

On January 22, 1861, Montgomery County representatives, Thomas M. McRae and Solon Homer Latimer, were among the 89 delegates who voted no to Georgia's immediate secession from the Union at the state secession convention. In addition, McRae and Latimer were among the 6 delegates who voiced their protest by against the Ordinance of Secession in the published document.

In the interior of the county around Gum Swamp (Modern Chauncey, Georgia) near the Pulaski County, Telfair County, and Montgomery County lines a deserter gang fought against Confederate forces.

Additional counties created
On August 18, 1905, Montgomery County gained and lost some territory during the creation of Toombs County. On August 14, 1912, the parts of Montgomery County between the Little Ocmulgee River and the Oconee River became Wheeler County. On August 21, 1917, Montgomery lost additional territory during the creation of Treutlen County, Georgia.

Modern
More recently, the county was noted for its practice of organizing segregated proms, a practice that had continued since integration of its schools in the 1970s. Following publicity about this practice, Montgomery County students took the initiative to integrate the prom in 2010.

Geography

The southeastern quarter of Montgomery County is located in the Altamaha River sub-basin of the larger river basin by the same name. The western half of the county, from Tarrytown south, is located in the Lower Oconee River sub-basin of the Altamaha River basin. The northeastern quarter of Montgomery County, northeast of a line from Tarrytown to Higgston, is located in the Ohoopee River sub-basin of the same Altamaha River basin.

Major highways

  U.S. Route 221
  U.S. Route 280
  State Route 15
  State Route 29
  State Route 30
  State Route 56
  State Route 130
  State Route 135
  State Route 199
  State Route 292
  State Route 298

Adjacent counties
 Treutlen County (north)
 Toombs County (east)
 Jeff Davis County (south)
 Wheeler County (west)

Demographics

2000 census
As of the census of 2000, there were 8,270 people, 2,919 households, and 2,063 families living in the county.  The population density was 13/km2 (34/mi2).  There were 3,492 housing units at an average density of 6/km2 (14/mi2).  The racial makeup of the county was 69.72% White, 27.24% Black or African American, 0.07% Native American, 0.19% Asian, 0.02% Pacific Islander, 2.13% from other races, and 0.62% from two or more races.  3.28% of the population were Hispanic or Latino of any race.

There were 2,919 households, out of which 34.00% had children under the age of 18 living with them, 53.10% were married couples living together, 13.50% had a female householder with no husband present, and 29.30% were non-families. 25.60% of all households were made up of individuals, and 10.20% had someone living alone who was 65 years of age or older.  The average household size was 2.57 and the average family size was 3.08.

In the county, the population was spread out, with 25.00% under the age of 18, 12.80% from 18 to 24, 30.20% from 25 to 44, 21.40% from 45 to 64, and 10.60% who were 65 years of age or older.  The median age was 34 years. For every 100 females, there were 105.10 males.  For every 100 females age 18 and over, there were 105.50 males.

The median income for a household in the county was $30,240, and the median income for a family was $38,418. Males had a median income of $27,572 versus $21,342 for females. The per capita income for the county was $14,182.  About 15.80% of families and 19.90% of the population were below the poverty line, including 24.70% of those under age 18 and 23.90% of those age 65 or over.

2010 census
As of the 2010 United States Census, there were 9,123 people, 3,287 households, and 2,350 families living in the county. The racial makeup of the county was 69.0% white, 26.3% black or African American, 0.3% Asian, 0.1% American Indian, 3.3% from other races, and 1.1% from two or more races. Those of Hispanic or Latino origin made up 5.3% of the population. In terms of ancestry, 24.7% were English, 12.3% were American, and 5.9% were Irish.

Of the 3,287 households, 34.7% had children under the age of 18 living with them, 51.4% were married couples living together, 15.5% had a female householder with no husband present, 28.5% were non-families, and 24.9% of all households were made up of individuals. The average household size was 2.55 and the average family size was 3.05. The median age was 37.0 years.

The median income for a household in the county was $35,182 and the median income for a family was $45,989. Males had a median income of $36,909 versus $27,037 for females. The per capita income for the county was $17,168. About 16.4% of families and 18.2% of the population were below the poverty line, including 21.3% of those under age 18 and 20.6% of those age 65 or over.

2020 census

As of the 2020 United States census, there were 8,610 people, 3,097 households, and 2,102 families residing in the county.

Communities
 Ailey
 Alston
 Charlotteville
 Higgston
 Mount Vernon (county seat)
 Tarrytown
 Uvalda

Politics

See also

 National Register of Historic Places listings in Montgomery County, Georgia
List of counties in Georgia

References

 
Georgia (U.S. state) counties
1793 establishments in Georgia (U.S. state)
Vidalia, Georgia, micropolitan area
Populated places established in 1793